Pikkarainen is a Finnish surname. Notable people with the surname include:

 Tommi Pikkarainen (born 1969), Finnish football manager and former player
 Kimmo Pikkarainen (born 1976), Finnish professional ice hockey defenceman
 Ilkka Pikkarainen (born 1981), Finnish ice hockey right winger
 Hannu Pikkarainen (born 1983), Finnish professional ice hockey defenceman
 Emilia Pikkarainen (born 1992), Finnish swimmer
 Juhani Pikkarainen (born 1998), Finnish footballer

Finnish-language surnames